Kundra may refer to:

Kundra, Budaun, is a village in Budaun district, Uttar Pradesh, India
František Kundra (born 1980), Slovak football midfielder
Karan Kundra (born 1984), Indian television actor
Navin Kundra (born 1985), British singer/songwriter
Nitin Kundra, English actor
Raj Kundra (born 1975), British Indian businessman
Vivek Kundra (born 1974), Indian American administrator
Bharat Kundra, Indian actor, model, and anchor 
 Shilpa Shetty Kundra, Indian actress, businesswoman

See also
 Kundera